Torchia is a surname. Notable people with the surname include:

Dennis Torchia, American biophysicist
Joseph Torchia (1948–1996), American author, photographer and reporter
Mike Torchia (born 1972), American ice hockey player
Tony Torchia (1943–2021), American baseball player